The Sparky Book is a 2006 animated/live-action short film by Newfoundland filmmaker Mary Lewis, about the near-death of a young girl who undergoes heart transplant surgery, and the death of her beloved pet dog, Sparky.

The story is based on the experiences of the director's own sister, Leah, who had two kidney transplants as a child. Michael Winter wrote a short story The Sparky Book after their dog had died. Director Lewis then loosely based her film on the short story. The film is narrated by a goldfish, voiced by Gordon Pinsent, with voice of Sparky by Joel Thomas Hynes. Leah Lewis appears in the film as "Bridget," a character based upon herself.

Produced by the National Film Board of Canada, the film received the Golden Sheaf Award for best experimental film and the Bill Boyle Award for Excellence in Screenwriting at Flicks: Saskatchewan International Youth Film Festival. In 2008, The Sparky Book was the sole film from Newfoundland and Labrador to be selected for CBC TV's "Short Film Faceoff", a six-part series showcasing films from Atlantic Canada.

References

External links
Watch The Sparky Book at NFB.ca

2006 films
National Film Board of Canada animated short films
Films based on short fiction
Films set in Newfoundland and Labrador
Films with live action and animation
Films about dogs
Biographical films about children
Films shot in Newfoundland and Labrador
2000s animated short films
2006 animated films
2000s English-language films